Mauricio Solaún (born 1935) is a professor of Latin American social and political institutions at the University of Illinois. He holds degrees in law, economics, and sociology from the Universidad de Villanueva, Cuba, Yale University, and the University of Chicago, respectively.

Solaún has been a visiting professor at the Universidad de los Andes and the Universidad Pontificia Javeriana in Bogotá, the Universidad de Belgrano in Buenos Aires, and the Universidad Católica de Valparaíso in Chile. He has been awarded several international fellowships and research grants, and has been a guest lecturer throughout Latin America and several countries in Europe and Asia. He has organized and directed study/internship programs in Colombia, Chile, Argentina, and Mexico.

Solaún was the first Cuban-American to serve as a U.S. Ambassador. From September 1977 to February 1979 he served in Nicaragua, where he organized locally a United States-sponsored mediation by the Organization of American States to avert civil war and obtain the peaceful democratization of the country. These international efforts failed in the face of the local unwillingness to compromise, and Solaún returned to his university post.

Works

References

External links
 

1935 births
Living people
Ambassadors of the United States to Nicaragua
American politicians of Cuban descent
American expatriate academics
Hispanic and Latino American diplomats
Academic staff of the University of Los Andes (Colombia)
Academic staff of the University of Belgrano
Academic staff of the Pontifical Catholic University of Valparaíso